Wiam Dislam (born 22 October 1987 in Rabat, Morocco) is a Moroccan taekwondo practitioner. She stands at 180 cm. She competed in the +67 kg event at the 2012 Summer Olympics and was the flag bearer for Morocco during the opening ceremony.

She competed in the +67 kg event at the 2016 Summer Olympics. She was defeated by Maria Espinoza of Mexico in the quarterfinals. She defeated Kirstie Alora of the Philippines in the repechage and was then defeated by Bianca Walkden of Great Britain in the bronze medal match. She was the flag bearer for Morocco during the closing ceremony.
Presently, she is a coach in fujairah martial arts club.

References 

1987 births
Living people
Moroccan female taekwondo practitioners
Olympic taekwondo practitioners of Morocco
Taekwondo practitioners at the 2012 Summer Olympics
Sportspeople from Rabat
Taekwondo practitioners at the 2016 Summer Olympics
Universiade medalists in taekwondo
Mediterranean Games bronze medalists for Morocco
Mediterranean Games medalists in taekwondo
Competitors at the 2018 Mediterranean Games
Universiade silver medalists for Morocco
African Taekwondo Championships medalists
Medalists at the 2011 Summer Universiade
20th-century Moroccan women
21st-century Moroccan women